Colkatay Columbus is a 2016 Bengali comedy-drama film directed by Saurav Palodhi and produced by Sony Aath & Joy B Ganguly. The film's music has been composed by Neel Dutt. The film starring Mir, Anirban Bhattacharya, Gaurav Chakrabarty, Ritabhari Chakraborty and Tanushree Chakraborty in the lead roles. The background score is by Dipankar Chaki while the lyrics are penned by Souvik Misra. This is a satirical film set in the present day at Kolkata.

Plot 
The story unfolds through an encounter of Columbus and two boys in Kolkata. When Columbus somehow lands up in Kolkata in 2016, he is surprised to see that everyone is in search of something. He is in search of roads that would lead him back home while the boys are in search for Columbus to get him to offer tips on attaining success. Columbus starts doling out suggestions to the boys but is also put off by the “competition”.

This film shows how Columbus couldn't bear competition. He was disheartened to see that he was not the only explorer. Every person around him was also an explorer, constantly searching for something.

Cast 
 Mir as Kristopher Columbus
 Gaurav Chakrabarty as Balohari Roy aka Roy
 Tanusree Chakraborty as Amropali
Anirban Bhattacharya as Soumik Gupta aka Sam
 Ritabhari Chakraborty as Shakira
Suchandra Vaneeya as Sneha
 Arijit Dutt

References

External links 
 

2016 films
Films set in Kolkata
Sony Pictures Networks India films
Bengali-language Indian films
2010s Bengali-language films
Sony Pictures films
Columbia Pictures films
Indian comedy-drama films